Plybothris sparsuta  is a Jewel Beetle of the Buprestidae family.

Description

Distribution
These beetles can be found in Madagascar.

References
 Universal Biological Indexer

External links
 Virtual-beetles
 World Field Guide

sparsuta
Buprestidae
Beetles described in 1837